1945 was a year in the 20th century that saw the end of World War II. 1945 may also refer to:

1945 (Gingrich and Forstchen novel), a 1995 novel by Newt Gingrich and William Fortschen
1945 (Conroy novel), a 2007 novel by Robert Conroy
1945 (EP), a 1994 EP by Soul-Junk
1945 (2017 film), a 2017 Hungarian film
1945 (2022 film), a 2022 Indian film

See also
Red Inferno: 1945, book by Robert Conroy